Dingleberry may refer to:

 Vaccinium erythrocarpum, species of cranberry-producing shrub
 Dingleberry Lake, lake in California, U.S. 
 Dingleberry, an alternate name for the Final Fantasy creature Tonberry used in Final Fantasy V

Slang
 Dried fecal and/or toilet paper fragments adhering to pubic hair
 Stupid or foolish person